Romania competed at the 1952 Summer Olympics in Helsinki, Finland. The nation returned to the Olympic Games after having missed the 1948 Summer Olympics. 114 competitors, 103 men and 11 women, took part in 67 events in 15 sports.

Medalists

Athletics

Basketball

Men's Team Competition
Qualification Round (Group C)
 Lost to Canada (51-72)
 Lost to Italy (39-53) → did not advance, 23rd place

Team Roster
  Dan Niculescu
  Mihai Nedef
  Andrei Folbert
  Corneliu Călugăreanu
  Grigore Costescu
  Emanoil Răducanu
  Ladislau Mokos
  Liviu Nagy
  Cezar Niculescu
  Adrian Petroșanu
  Vasile Popescu
  Gheorghe Constantinide

Boxing

Canoeing

Cycling

Road Competition
Men's Individual Road Race (190.4 km)
Constantin Stanescu — 5:20:01.4 (→ 29th place)
Marin Niculescu — 5:23:34.1 (→ 41st place)
Victor Georgescu — 5:24:27.5 (→ 44th place)
Petre Nuță — did not finish (→ no ranking)

Track Competition
Men's 1.000m Time Trial
Ion Ionita
 Final — 1:14.4 (→ 7th place)

Men's 1.000m Sprint Scratch Race
Ion Ionita — 25th place

Equestrian

Fencing

Eight fencers, all men, represented Romania in 1952.

Men's foil
 Vasile Chelaru
 Nicolae Marinescu
 Andrei Vîlcea

Men's team foil
 Andrei Vîlcea, Ilie Tudor, Nicolae Marinescu, Vasile Chelaru

Men's épée
 Nicolae Marinescu
 Vasile Chelaru
 Zoltan Uray

Men's sabre
 Adalbert Gurath, Sr.
 Ilie Tudor
 Ion Santo

Men's team sabre
 Andrei Vîlcea, Ion Santo, Ilie Tudor, Mihai Kokossy

Football

 Preliminary Round

Team Roster
  Ion Voinescu
  Aurel Crâsnic
  Traian Popa
  Vasile Zavoda
  Zoltan Farmati
  Iosif Kovács
  Guido Fodor
  Iosif Ritter
  Valeriu Călinoiu
  Eugen Iordache
  Ștefan Balint
  Tiberiu Bone
  Titus Ozon
  Tudor Paraschiva
  Iosif Petschovski
  Gavril Serfözö
  Ioan Suru
  Gheorghe Bodo
  Andrei Mercea
  Francisc Zavoda

Gymnastics

Rowing

Romania had nine male rowers participate in one out of seven rowing events in 1952.

 Men's eight
 Iosif Bergesz
 Milivoi Iancovici
 Ștefan Konyelicska
 Gheorghe Măcinic
 Ion Niga
 Ștefan Pongratz
 Alexandru Rotaru
 Ștefan Somogy
 Ion Vlăduț (cox)

Shooting

Four shooters represented Romania in 1952. Iosif Sîrbu won gold in the 50 m rifle, prone event and Gheorghe Lichiardopol won bronze in the 25 m pistol.

25 m pistol
 Gheorghe Lichiardopol
 Penait Calcai

50 m rifle, three positions
 Iosif Sîrbu

50 m rifle, prone
 Iosif Sîrbu
 Petre Cişmigu

Swimming

Water polo

Weightlifting

Wrestling

References

Nations at the 1952 Summer Olympics
1952
1952 in Romanian sport